Events in the year 1904 in Portugal.

Incumbents
Monarch: Carlos I
President of the Council of Ministers: Ernesto Hintze Ribeiro (until 20 October), José Luciano de Castro (from 20 October)

Events
26 June - Legislative election

Sport
28 February - Establishment of S.L. Benfica

References

 
Portugal
Years of the 20th century in Portugal
Portugal